"Back Where It's At" is a single by American country music artist George Hamilton IV. Released in August 1970, it was the third single from his album Back Where It's At. The song peaked at number 16 on the Billboard Hot Country Singles chart. It also reached number 1 on the RPM Country Tracks chart in Canada.

Chart performance

References 

1970 singles
George Hamilton IV songs
Song articles with missing songwriters